The Last Days of Emma Blank is a 2009 Dutch surrealist film directed by Alex van Warmerdam.

Cast
Marlies Heuer as Emma Blank
Gene Bervoets as Haneveld
Annet Malherbe as Bella
 as Gonnie
Gijs Naber as Meier
Alex van Warmerdam as Theo

References

External links

2009 comedy films
2009 films
Films directed by Alex van Warmerdam
Dutch black comedy films
2000s Dutch-language films